"Quit Playing Games (with My Heart)" is a song by American boy band Backstreet Boys, released in October 1996 as the fourth single from their international debut album (1996). It reached  1 in Austria, the Czech Republic, Germany, Lithuania, and Switzerland, No. 2 in the United Kingdom, and No. 7 in the Netherlands. The song was later included on the band's debut US album, and was released as the second single in June 1997, where it reached No. 2 on the Billboard Hot 100 chart, making it their most successful single on the chart. It sold 2 million copies in the US.

Rolling Stone ranked the song No. 26 on their list of the "75 Greatest Boy Band Songs of All Time" in 2020.

Background
Initially, Nick Carter, aged 15 at the time, was unable to sing on the recording of the song as he was undergoing puberty. The remaining band members were brought over to Stockholm for a week to record "We've Got It Goin' On" in late June 1995. They unexpectedly finished the song in just two days and decided to record "Quit Playing Games (with My Heart)" immediately afterwards. The single was not the label's first choice to release for the group's US return, as they initially wanted to release the Mutt Lange-produced "If You Want It to Be Good Girl (Get Yourself a Bad Boy)", but the band argued against it, claiming that it was one of their worst songs. Jive president Barry Weiss claimed that the other serious contenders included "Anywhere for You" and "All I Have to Give". The group also wanted to reshoot the music video, but the label refused, arguing that they only planned to market towards radio, not video. The song ultimately succeeded without MTV support. The background vocals in the song, besides McLean's self-harmonization on the bridge, consisted of Brian Littrell and Kevin Richardson, who decided to finish the song while the other members were having lunch.

Critical reception
AllMusic editor Stephen Thomas Erlewine wrote that the "slick production adds luster to the singles "Quit Playin' Games (With My Heart)" and "As Long as You Love Me", making them as irresistible as teen pop can be." Larry Flick from Billboard noted that the song "cruises at a sweet jeep/funk pace, leaving plenty of room for a romantic lead vocal and layers of smooth harmonies." Can't Stop the Pop commented, "This is very much the archetypal Backstreet Boys mid-tempo, which laid the groundwork for many of their subsequent hits. [...] It expertly weaves together a distinctive guitar melody with shimmering ‘90s pop production (and a pseudo-R&B beat) to create a song that glistens with a halcyon sunniness from start to finish. Cheiron would refine and evolve the formula in the years that followed, but here we have it in its purest form. And it is terrific." 

Greg Kot from Chicago Tribune said that on "Quit Playing Games (With My Heart)" and "As Long As You Love Me", "the boys embodied teen-dream vulnerability." A reviewer from Music Week rated the song three out of five, viewing it as "a warm, mid-tempo, but somewhat unexceptional, R&B number. A fourth big UK hit beckons." Gerald Martinez from New Sunday Times described it as "bittersweet". People Magazine called it a "peppy" ballad, noting that "despite a tinge of melancholy in the group's harmonies, one can't help smiling." Bob Waliszewski of Plugged In said that on the song, "the singer longs to return to days before insensitivity and manipulation threatened to destroy the friendship." Polish magazine Porcys listed it at number 96 in their ranking of "100 Singles 1990-1999", calling it a "clever" ballad.

Variations

Original version
The original recording of the song features Brian Littrell singing both verses. This version was featured on the early release of their 1996 debut album and is featured on the 1997 debut US album.

Single version
A year and half after it was recorded, Max Martin was flown to London in August 1996 to re-record the second verse with Nick Carter at Battery Studios. This version was added to the later pressings of their 1996 international debut album and on the 1998 re-release of the US debut album. This is the version that was released as a single.

Italian version
There is also an Italian version of this song, titled "Non Puoi Lasciarmi Così", included in the Italian release of the international debut album. The lead vocals of the first two verses are sung by Kevin Richardson and Howie Dorough.

Modern Talking
"Don't Play with My Heart", a song from Modern Talking's 1998 album Back for Good, closely resembles this song.

Music video
The accompanying music video for "Quit Playing Games (with My Heart)" was filmed in Orlando, Florida on July 1, 1996. It was directed by Kai Sehr, and shows the group dancing and singing on a deserted basketball court at night. Halfway in the video, it begins to rain. Then the boys' shirts are unbuttoned, showing their bare upper bodies as they continues to perform wet in the rain.

During the video shoot, Nick Carter lip-synced over Brian Littrell's vocals, as he didn't record his vocals until August that year. Initially, MTV was hesitant to air the video due to the boys taking their shirts off in the rain, but reluctantly embraced it after TRL viewership caught on with audiences. The music video premiered in October 1996 in Germany and in the week of June 15–22, 1997 in the U.S..

Track listing

 America
CD1 (Old version)
 "Quit Playing Games (with My Heart)" (Video Version) – 3:52
 "Backstreet Boys Present... (Album Medley)" – 6:57
 "Lay Down Beside Me" – 5:30
 "Quit Playing Games (with My Heart)" (LP Version) – 3:49

CD2 (New version)
 "Quit Playing Games (with My Heart)" (LP Version)
 "Quit Playing Games (with My Heart)" (E-SMOOVE Vocal Mix)
 "Quit Playing Games (with My Heart)" (Jazzy Jim's Mixxshoww Slamma)
 "Quit Playing Games (with My Heart)" (Maurice Joshua Club Mix)

 Europe
CD1 (Classic version)
 "Quit Playing Games (with My Heart)" (Video Version) – 3:52
 "Nobody But You" (Long Version) – 6:07
 "Give Me Your Heart" – 5:06
 "Quit Playing Games (with My Heart)" (Acoustic Version) – 3:56

CD2 (Winter version)
 "Quit Playing Games (with My Heart)" (Video Version) – 3:56
 "Christmas Time" – 4:20
 "Lay Down Beside Me" – 5:32
 "Quit Playing Games (with My Heart)" (Acoustic Version) – 3:57

 UK
 "Quit Playing Games (with My Heart)" (Video Version) – 3:54
 "Nobody But You" (Long Version) – 6:08
 "Give Me Your Heart" – 5:08
 "Lay Down Beside Me" – 5:27

Cassette
 "Quit Playing Games (with My Heart)" (Video Version) – 3:52
 "Lay Down Beside Me" – 5:30

 Japan
 "Quit Playing Games (with My Heart)" (Video Version) – 3:52
 "Quit Playing Games (with My Heart)" (Acoustic Version) – 4:02
 "Anywhere for You" – 4:40
 "Don't Leave Me" – 4:18

Charts

Weekly charts

Year-end charts

Decade-end charts

Certifications

Release history

References

External links
 Quit Playing Games (With My Heart) Song Chords

1995 songs
1996 singles
1997 singles
1990s ballads
Backstreet Boys songs
European Hot 100 Singles number-one singles
Jive Records singles
Number-one singles in Austria
Number-one singles in the Czech Republic
Number-one singles in Germany
Number-one singles in Switzerland
Pop ballads
Song recordings produced by Max Martin
Songs written by Herbie Crichlow
Songs written by Max Martin
Torch songs